The United States National Snipe Championship is the annual national championship for sailing in the Snipe class. It is among the oldest One-Design class championships in the United States.

Between 1934 and 1947 it was considered the SCIRA World Championship, with the winning skipper receiving the Commodore Hub E. Isaacks Trophy, but as the event became international after World War II, SCIRA's commodore Charles Heinzerling created a separate trophy for the USA champion and since then the winning skipper is awarded the Commodore Charles E. Heinzerling Trophy, and the winning crew is awarded the Portage Lakes Yacht Club Trophy.

When the fleet is large enough, the Snipe Nationals are held in two parts. The first is an elimination series called the Crosby Series, where the Crosby Memorial Trophy is awarded. After three races, the top 33 boats sail in the Heinzerling Series which determines the national champion. The remaining competitors sail in the Wells Series for the Wells Trophy.

Other trophies awarded are the Slauson Memorial Trophy for the second-place team; Eleanor Williams Memorial Trophy for the highest placing woman (skipper or crew); Carolyn Nute Memorial Trophy for the highest placing married couple; Masters Trophy for the highest placing master skipper; Masters Endurance Trophy for the oldest skipper; Macklanburg-Duncan Trophy for the chairman of the Race Committee; National Secretary Trophy for the regatta chairperson.

Winners

References

External links 
SCIRA USA

Snipe competitions
Snipe